Hieracium argenteum is a species of flowering plant belonging to the family Asteraceae.

Its native range is Northwestern and Northern Europe.

References

argenteum